Ivan Stepanovich Adamovich (1752–1813) was a highly-decorated Russian general who fought at the Battle of Borodino, commanding the 1st Corps of the Reserve Army.

Ivan Adamovich fought the Ottoman Turks and Napoleonic France as a seasoned and highly experienced warrior who long ago earned his stripes under fire. In 1794, Adamovich was pensioned with the rank of major general, aged 41. It was Alexander I, Paul I's successor, who recalled him to active service on 17 September 1812 with great honors. The events of 1812 forced him to come out of retirement and engage himself in the battle against the invading French by leading the 1st Corps of the Reserve Army during the Battle of Borodino. The last written traces about him are from 1813 where it is said that he died with his boots on while serving Imperial Russia.

Biography
Adamovich came from an old noble family based in the region of the Serbian Banat Military Frontier (now part of Serbia and Romania), where his father Stepan Adamovich, an officer in the Austrian military in 1752 emigrated with his family to Imperial Russia. After graduating from the Cadet Corps in Saint Petersburg, he joined the Imperial Russian Army as a young, career soldier.

He was a lieutenant colonel with the Preobrazhensky Regiment before being promoted to major general and appointed chef of the Pavlovsky Grenadier Regiment on 14 February 1789. He was awarded the Russian Order of Saint Anna on 10 November 1796. Two years later, on 26 August 1798, he took his first retirement, but a few years later he became determined to be in the army, once again. On 8 January 1807, during the War of the Fourth Coalition, he was awarded a Golden Weapon "For Bravery". On 13 May 1809 a patent for the rank of General was issued to Major General Ivan Adamovich signed by Alexander I and Count Aleksey Arakcheyev for Adamovich's conspicuous role in the War of the Fifth Coalition. Three years later, he retired for the second time, but on 5 September 1812, he returned to the army once again, joining his comrade-at-arms in the Battle of Borodino.

In the autumn of 1812 Field Marshall Mikhail Kutuzov determined to create a proper reserve from the Narodnoe Opolchenie or people's militia. In October he sent Ivan Adamovich to Arzramas to organize reserve formations as part of this program. This done, in 1813 Adamovich was named to serve as commander of one of four brigades making up to 20,000- men Reserve Army that backed the main Russian force as it crossed the Niemen river.

Finally, on 16 December 1813, he retired for good.

Awards and decorations
 Order of Saint Anna, 2nd degree (10 November 1796)
 Golden Weapon "For Bravery" (8 January 1807)

See also
 Peter Ivanovich Ivelich
 Ivan Shevich
 Andrei Miloradovich
 Avram Ratkov
 Nikolay Bogdanov
 Nikolay Depreradovich
 Mikhail Miloradovich
 Georgi Emmanuel
 Ilya Duka
 Jovan Albanez
 Jovan Šević
 Jovan Horvat
 Semyon Zorich
 Anto Gvozdenović
 Marko Ivanovich Voinovich
 Matija Zmajević

References 

Generals of the Russian Empire
Nobility from the Russian Empire
1752 births
1813 deaths
People from the Russian Empire of Serbian descent
Russian people of Serbian descent